DWQP (92.1 FM) is a radio station owned and operated by the Government of Quirino. The station's studio and transmitter are located in Capitol Hills, Cabarroguis.

References

Radio stations established in 2015